North Pointe Community Church is an evangelical pentecostal church affiliated with Pentecostal Assemblies of Canada, in Edmonton, Alberta, Canada. The senior pastor is Mike Voll.

History 
The church was founded in 1917 by Pastor John McAlister under the name of Bethel Pentecostal Assembly. In 1933, the church was renamed Edmonton Pentecostal Tabernacle and a new building was inaugurated. In 1963, the church was renamed Edmonton Central Pentecostal Tabernacle. A new building (the “Square building”) with a seating capacity of 1,000 people was designed by Peter Hemingway and dedicated on October 4, 1964. In 1972, the “Pyramid building”, with a seating capacity of 1,800 was inaugurated. In 1985, the attendance was 1,249 people. In 2006, the “Square building” and the “Pyramid building” were sold, and the church opened a new building in the north of Edmonton.

References

External links
 Official Website

Churches in Edmonton
Pentecostal churches in Canada